Elizabeth Carlsdotter Gyllenhielm (Swedish: Elisabet; 1622-1682), was the daughter of the Swedish prince Charles Philip, Duke of Södermanland, in his secret marriage with the noble Elizabeth Ribbing.

Elizabeth Carlsdotter was born posthumously after the death of her father, and it was not until after his death that the marriage of her parents was revealed. Though legitimate, she was granted the name Gyllenhielm, a name previously often granted to illegitimate children of royalty: she herself, however, referred to herself only by her patronymic Elizabeth Carlsdotter. She was raised at the court of her paternal grandmother, Queen dowager Christina. 

Prior to her marriage, she served as maid of honor to Queen dowager Maria Eleonora and to her cousin, the reigning Queen Christina of Sweden. She married the noble Axel Turesson Natt och Dag in 1645. 
Between 1654 and 1660, she served as överhovmästarinna to the Queen Hedwig Eleonora. 

In 1660, she married the noble and courtier Balthasar Marschalck. She had one son in her first marriage, who died childless.

References 

 Elisabet Carlsdotter (Gyllenhielm) i Wilhelmina Stålberg, Anteckningar om svenska qvinnor (1864)
 Elisabet Carlsdotter (Gyllenhielm) i Herman Hofberg, Svenskt biografiskt handlexikon (andra upplagan, 1906)
 Magdalena Ribbing: Ätten Ribbing, 700 år i Sveriges historia
 Lars Ericson: Johan III
 Gyllenhielm, släktnamn, urn:sbl:13374, Svenskt biografiskt lexikon, hämtad 2015-02-16.
 http://www.adelsvapen.com/genealogi/Vasa

1622 births
1682 deaths
Swedish maids of honour
17th-century Swedish women
Mistresses of the Robes (Sweden)
People of the Swedish Empire
17th-century Swedish nobility